The Blackstone Valley Tribune is a weekly newspaper in the towns of Northbridge, Douglas, and Uxbridge, Massachusetts.

The Blackstone Valley Tribune was established in May 1983.  The Blackstone Valley News Tribune/Advertiser was established in the 1950s by Warren Roundy.

References

External links
Blackstone Valley Tribune archive

Newspapers published in Massachusetts
Mass media in Worcester County, Massachusetts